Speed limits in Croatia are regulated by the Road Traffic Safety Act.

Four general speed limits apply on Croatian roads:

  within inhabited places, or up to  where explicitly permitted
  outside inhabited places
  on expressways (brza cesta)
  on freeways (autocesta)

Lower speed limits apply to buses, heavy, trailer and towing vehicles, and tractors.

The limits shown above apply only if there are no other signs present, as the signs may prescribe a lower or a higher speed limit or enforce a traffic rule that affects speed. 

Due to legal requirements for speed measuring, there is a tolerance of 10 km/h under 100 km/h, and 10% above that.

Limits of 100 km/h or higher can also be found within inhabited places.

Depending on the severity of the violation, driving faster than the speed limit is punishable by a fine in the amount between HRK 300 and 20,000 (roughly €40–2650). Exceeding the speed limit by more than 50 km/h in a populated area may also be punished by imprisonment of up to 60 days.

See also
 Highways in Croatia

References

Sources
 

Croatia
Road transport in Croatia